Created by Gene Roddenberry, the science fiction television series Star Trek (which eventually acquired the retronym Star Trek: The Original Series) starred William Shatner as Captain James T. Kirk, Leonard Nimoy as Mr. Spock, and DeForest Kelley as Dr. Leonard "Bones" McCoy aboard the fictional Federation starship USS Enterprise. The series originally aired from September 1966 through June 1969 on NBC.

This is the first television series in the Star Trek franchise, and comprises 79 regular episodes over the series' three seasons, along with the series' original pilot episode, "The Cage". The episodes are listed in order by original air date, which match the episode order in each season's original, remastered, and Blu-ray DVD box sets. The original, single-disc DVD releases placed the episodes by production order, with "The Cage" on the final disc.

After the series' cancellation, Paramount Television released Star Trek to television stations as a syndication package, where the series' popularity grew to become a "major phenomenon within popular culture". This popularity would eventually lead to the expansion of the Star Trek catalog, which as of 2020 includes nine more television series and thirteen Trek motion pictures.

In 2006, CBS Paramount Domestic Television (now CBS Television Distribution) announced that each Original Series episode would be re-syndicated in high definition after undergoing digital remastering, including both new and enhanced visual effects. (To date, the remastered episodes have only been broadcast in standard definition, though all three seasons are now available on the high-definition Blu-ray Disc format.) The remastered episodes began with "Balance of Terror" (along with, in some markets, "Miri") during the weekend of September 16, 2006, and ended with "The Cage", which aired during the weekend of May 2, 2009.  The remastered air dates listed below are based on the weekend each episode aired in syndication.

Series overview

Episodes

Pilots (1964–65)
Star Treks pilot episode, "The Cage", was completed between November 1964 and January 1965, and starred Jeffrey Hunter as Captain Christopher Pike, Majel Barrett as Number One, and Leonard Nimoy as Spock. The pilot was rejected by NBC as being "too cerebral" among other complaints. Jeffrey Hunter chose to withdraw from the role of Pike when creator Gene Roddenberry was asked to produce a second pilot episode "Where No Man Has Gone Before". A slightly edited version with the same title aired in 1966 as the third episode of the new series.

"The Cage" never aired during Star Treks original run. It was presented by Roddenberry as a black-and-white workprint at various science fiction conventions over the years after Star Treks cancellation but was not released on home video until 1986 when Paramount Home Video produced a "restored" release of "The Cage" (a combination of the original black-and-white footage and color portions of the Season 1 episode "The Menagerie") along with an introduction by Gene Roddenberry.

On October 15, 1988, Paramount Pictures aired a two-hour television special, hosted by Patrick Stewart, called The Star Trek Saga: From One Generation to the Next, which featured, for the first time, a full-color television presentation of "The Cage". In the United States, "The Cage" was released to DVD in December 2001. It was later included on the final disc in both the original and "remastered" season 3 DVD box sets listed with its original air date of October 15, 1988.

"Where No Man Has Gone Before" in its original form (production number 02a) had been forwarded to NBC, but only a re-edited version was aired, not as a pilot but as the third episode of the series (production number 02b). The original version was thought to be lost, but later appeared on bootleg VHS tapes at conventions, until a print of it was discovered in 2009 and subsequently released on home video under the title "Where No Fan Has Gone Before" - The Restored, Unaired Alternate Pilot Episode as part of the TOS season 3 box set on Blu-ray; it has not been released on DVD. This version remains unaired.

Season 1 (1966–67)

After Roddenberry's second pilot episode, "Where No Man Has Gone Before", received a more favorable response from NBC, Star Trek finally aired its first episode—"The Man Trap"—at 8:30PM on September 8, 1966. "Where No Man...", which eventually aired in a re-edited format as the series' third episode, retained only Spock as a character from "The Cage" but introduced William Shatner as Captain James T. Kirk, James Doohan as chief engineer Scotty, and George Takei as physicist (later helmsman) Sulu. Also joining the cast were DeForest Kelley as ship's surgeon Dr. Leonard "Bones" McCoy and Nichelle Nichols as the communications officer Uhura in "The Man Trap", the first aired episode of the series.

Although her character of Number One was not retained from "The Cage", Majel Barrett returned to the series as a new character, nurse Christine Chapel, and made her first of many recurring appearances in "The Naked Time". Grace Lee Whitney appeared in eight episodes as yeoman Janice Rand, beginning with "The Man Trap". Whitney left the series after "The Conscience of the King", but would later make minor appearances in the first, third, fourth, and sixth Star Trek films as well as one episode of the companion series Star Trek: Voyager.

Star Treks first season comprised 29 episodes, including the two-part episode "The Menagerie", which includes almost all of the footage from the original pilot, "The Cage". Other notable episodes include "Balance of Terror", which introduces the Romulans; "Space Seed", which introduces Khan Noonien Singh and serves as the basis for Star Trek II: The Wrath of Khan; "Errand of Mercy", in which the Klingons make their first appearance; and the critically acclaimed, Hugo-Award-winning episode "The City on the Edge of Forever", which features Kirk, Spock, and McCoy traveling into the past through the Guardian of Forever.

Season 2 (1967–68)

The show's 26-episode second season began in September 1967 with "Amok Time", which introduced actor Walter Koenig as Russian navigator Pavel Chekov, and granted viewers the first glimpse of Spock's homeworld, Vulcan. The season also includes such notable episodes as "Mirror, Mirror", which introduces the evil "mirror universe"; "Journey to Babel", featuring the introduction of Spock's parents Sarek and Amanda; and the light-hearted "The Trouble with Tribbles", which would later be revisited in a 1973 episode of Star Trek: The Animated Series and a 1996 episode of Star Trek: Deep Space Nine. The season ended with "Assignment: Earth", an attempt to launch a spin-off television series set in the 1960s.

Season 3 (1968–69)

After Star Treks second season, NBC was prepared to cancel the show due to low ratings. Led by fans Bjo and John Trimble, Trek viewers inundated NBC with letters protesting the show's demise and pleading with the network to renew the series for another year.

After NBC agreed to produce a third season, the network promised Gene Roddenberry that the show would air in a favorable timeslot (Mondays at 7:30 p.m.), but later changed the schedule so that Trek would air in the so-called "death slot"—Friday nights at 10:00 p.m. In addition to the "mismanaged" schedule, the show's budget was "seriously slashed" and Nichelle Nichols described the series' eventual cancellation as "a self-fulfilling prophecy".

Star Treks final, 24-episode season began in September 1968 with "Spock's Brain". The third season also includes "The Tholian Web", where Kirk becomes trapped between universes; this episode would later be revisited by two 2005 episodes of the prequel series Star Trek: Enterprise. The last episode of the series, "Turnabout Intruder", aired on June 3, 1969, but Star Trek would eventually return to television in animated form when the animated Star Trek debuted in September 1973.

Production order
The list below details the series' episodes in production order, including the original series pilot, "The Cage". While the "complete season" DVD releases (listed above) follow the original broadcast order, the original episodic DVD releases are numbered by production order.

British transmission

Star Trek was first broadcast in the United Kingdom on BBC One starting on July 12, 1969, with the episode "Where No Man Has Gone Before".  The first episode broadcast in color was "Arena" on November 15, 1969.  The episodes were broadcast in a different order than in the United States and were originally aired in four seasons between 1969 and 1971.  The BBC edited the episodes for broadcast by showing the title sequence first, then the teaser segment that aired before the titles in the United States, then the rest of the episode.  These edited episodes aired until the 1990s, after which the BBC was supplied with NTSC videotape transfers of the first season instead of new film prints, resulting in a substandard picture, and with edits originally made for syndication in the United States.  Viewer complaints led to the BBC obtaining film prints for the subsequent two seasons.

"The Cage" was first broadcast on Sky One in July 1990.  Three episodes, "Plato's Stepchildren", "The Empath", and "Whom Gods Destroy", were not broadcast on the BBC until 1994, although "The Empath" was listed in the Radio Times as scheduled to broadcast on December 16, 1970, at 7:20 pm.  Sky One was the first network to air these three episodes in the UK in 1990, although with the title sequence and teaser shown in the order as they were aired in the United States, whereas the rest of the episodes were broadcast as edited by the BBC.

See also

 Lists of Star Trek episodes

References

External links

Original Series, The
 
Star Trek:

ca:Star Trek (sèrie original)#Capítols